The enzyme Glucosaminate ammonia-lyase (EC 4.3.1.9) catalyzes the chemical reaction

2-amino-2-deoxy-D-gluconate = 2-dehydro-3-deoxy-D-gluconate + NH3 (overall reaction)
(1a) 2-amino-2-deoxy-Dgluconate = (2Z,4S,5R)-2-amino-4,5,6-trihydroxyhex-2-enoate + H2O
(1b) (2Z,4S,5R)-2-amino-4,5,6-trihydroxyhex-2-enoate = (4S,5R)-4,5,6-trihydroxy-2-iminohexanoate (spontaneous)
(1c) (4S,5R)-4,5,6-trihydroxy-2-iminohexanoate + H2O = 2-dehydro-3-deoxyD-gluconate + NH3 (spontaneous)

This enzyme belongs to the family of lyases, specifically ammonia lyases, which cleave carbon-nitrogen bonds.  The systematic name of this enzyme class is 2-amino-2-deoxy-D-gluconate ammonia-lyase (isomerizing; 2-dehydro-3-deoxy-D-gluconate-forming). Other names in common use include glucosaminic dehydrase, D-glucosaminate dehydratase, D-glucosaminic acid dehydrase, aminodeoxygluconate dehydratase, 2-amino-2-deoxy-D-gluconate hydro-lyase (deaminating), aminodeoxygluconate ammonia-lyase, 2-amino-2-deoxy-D-gluconate ammonia-lyase, and D-glucosaminate ammonia-lyase.  This enzyme participates in the pentose phosphate pathway.  It employs one cofactor, pyridoxal phosphate.

References

 
 
 
 

EC 4.3.1
Pyridoxal phosphate enzymes
Enzymes of unknown structure